Air Marshal Sir Bruce Reid Ferguson,  (born 14 July 1949) is a retired Royal New Zealand Air Force officer who served as Chief of the New Zealand Defence Force and Director of the Government Communications Security Bureau. He took up the appointment when the previous director, Warren Tucker, was appointed as Director of the Security Intelligence Service on 1 November 2006. Ferguson's term of appointment was for four years, stepping down from the role in 2011. Following his retirement, in July 2012, he was appointed as a Justice of the Peace for New Zealand.

Previous to this he was the acting director of the New Zealand Ministry of Civil Defence & Emergency Management, after he retired earlier in 2006 from a distinguished military career which culminated in four years as the New Zealand Chief of Defence Force.

Early life and family
Ferguson was born in Napier on 14 July 1949, the son of Phyllis and Arthur Ferguson, and educated at Tauranga Boys' College. In 1974, he married Rosemary Rondel, and the couple went on to have three children.

List of education and training qualifications
 1970 – Graduated as RNZAF pilot
 1989 – Graduated USAF Air War College
 1995 – Graduated Royal College of Defence Studies
 2000 – Graduated Ashridge Senior Executive Management Course
 2001 – Senior Fellow, Asia Pacific Strategic Studies College
 2006 – Distinguished Fellow of the Institute for Strategic Leadership

List of career highlights and achievements
 1969–73 – Pilot training/operational flying
 1973–82 – Flying instructor/Commander, Search and Rescue detachment/operational flying
 1982–84 – Commanding officer, Central Flying School
 1984–86 – Staff officer to Chief of the Air Staff
 1986–88 – Director, Air Force Personnel/USAF Air War College
 1989–91 – Officer Commanding, RNZAF Operations Wing
 1991–95 – Commander, RNZAF Base Auckland/Royal College of Defence Studies
 1995–97 – Chief of Air Force Personnel
 1997–2001 – Assistant Chief of Defence Force (Personnel)
 2001–2006 – Chief of Defence Force
 2006–2006 – Acting Director, Ministry of Civil Defence & Emergency Management (MCDEM)
 2006–2011 – Director, Government Communications Security Bureau (GCSB)

List of honours and awards

 1977 – Queen's Commendation for Valuable Service in the Air in the 1978 New Year Honours
 1984 – Air Force Cross in the 1984 Queen's Birthday Honours
 1990 – New Zealand 1990 Commemoration Medal
 1994 – Officer of the Order of the British Empire in the 1994 Queen's Birthday Honours
 2006 – Darjah Utama Bakti Cemerlang (Tentera) (Distinguished Service Order) (Singapore)
 2006 – Distinguished Companion of the New Zealand Order of Merit, for services to the New Zealand Defence Force, in the 2006 Queen's Birthday Honours
 2009 – DCNZM redesignated as Knight Companion of the New Zealand Order of Merit

References

External links
Image – NZ Army Image Gallery

 

|-

1949 births
Knights Companion of the New Zealand Order of Merit
Living people
Chiefs of Defence Force (New Zealand)
New Zealand people of Scottish descent
New Zealand Officers of the Order of the British Empire
People from Napier, New Zealand
New Zealand recipients of the Air Force Cross (United Kingdom)
Recipients of the Commendation for Valuable Service in the Air
Recipients of the Darjah Utama Bakti Cemerlang (Tentera)
Royal New Zealand Air Force air marshals
People educated at Tauranga Boys' College
New Zealand military personnel of the Vietnam War